The land known as the Hessian Hinterland lies within the region of Middle Hesse and is concentrated around the old county of Biedenkopf, that is the western part of the present county of Marburg-Biedenkopf, as well as elements of the present-day counties of Lahn-Dill-Kreis and Waldeck-Frankenberg. Formerly it snaked its way from Bromskirchen in the north to Rodheim (near Gießen), in the municipality of Biebertal.

The Hinterland was originally territory belonging to Hesse-Darmstadt, from which it was almost completely isolated, and managed by the Ämter of Blankenstein (Gladenbach) with the Breidenbacher Grund, Biedenkopf and Battenberg (Eder). Later the description was just applied to the old county of Biedenkopf.

Today the term is used locally for those parts of the old county of Biedenkopf that were absorbed into the Marburg-Biedenkopf. The Hinterland Intercommunal Cooperative (Interkommunale Zusammenarbeit Hinterland, a special purpose association set up in 2006, has given the name for this small region a public institutional significance again.

In Hinterland a dialect of Low German known as Hinterländer Platt is spoken – albeit by fewer and fewer people, mostly just its older, local inhabitants.

Administrative units today 
The following towns and villages (arranged from north to south) are part of Hinterland:
 Waldeck-Frankenberg: Bromskirchen, Allendorf (Eder), Battenberg (Eder), Hatzfeld (Eder), Vöhl
 Marburg-Biedenkopf: Biedenkopf, Breidenbach, Dautphetal, Steffenberg, Angelburg, Bad Endbach, Gladenbach (apart from Weitershausen)
 Lahn-Dill-Kreis: Simmersbach and Roth, today in the municipality of Eschenburg, Bischoffen all villages, the quarter of Waldgirmes in the town of Lahnau and the quarters of Naunheim and Hermannstein in Wetzlar.
 Gießen: Biebertal less Vetzberg

References

Literature 
 Elsa Blöcher: Das Hinterland. Ein Heimatbuch. Stephani, Biedenkopf, 1981.
 Elsa Blöcher, Hinterländer Geschichtsverein (ed.): Beiträge zur Geschichte des Hinterlandes. Biedenkopf, 1985.
 Hans Friebertshäuser: Mundart und Volksleben im Altkreis Biedenkopf. Volksbank und Raiffeisenbank, Biedenkopf-Gladenbach, 1998.
 Jens Friedhoff: Hessen contra Mainz, Burg- und Stadtgründungen als Instrument hessischer und mainzischer Territorialpolitik im Hinterland. Region und Geschichte, Festschrift zum 100-jährigen Bestehen des Hinterländer Geschichtsvereins e. V., Beiträge zur Geschichte des Hinterlandes, Vol. IX, Biedenkopf, 2008, pp. 108–132.
 Karl Huth, Kreisausschuß des Landkreises Biedenkopf (ed.): Wirtschafts- und Sozialgeschichte des Landkreises Biedenkopf 1800–1866. Wetzlar, 1962.
 Christoph Kaiser: Die Tracht als veränderliche Kleidung. Beschrieben anhand der Trachten des Hessischen Hinterlandes, insbesondere der Tracht des Untergerichts des Breidenbacher Grundes. Grin, Munich, 2008, .
 Regina Klein: In der Zwischenzeit. Tiefenhermeneutische Fallstudien zur weiblichen Verortung im Modernisierungsprozess 1900–2000. Psychosozial-Verlag, Gießen, 2003,  (Life story of three Hinterland women).
 Ulrich Lennarz: Die Territorialgeschichte des hessischen Hinterlandes. Elwert, Marburg, 1973, .
 Bernhard Martin, Kreisausschuß des Landkreises Biedenkopf (publ.): Alte Lieder aus dem Hinterland. Wetzlarer Verlagsdruckerei, Wetzlar ,1964 (Liederbuch).
 Kerstin Werner: Wandern zwischen zwei Welten – Die Geschichte der Hinterländer / Arbeitsmigration in der Wetterau. In: Michael Keller, Herfried Münkler (ed.): Die Wetterau. Sparkasse Wetterau, Friedberg, 1990, .
 Hinterländer Geschichtsverein e. V. (Hrsg.): Lebensbilder aus dem Hinterland, Geschichte, Landschaft und Dialekt als Bedingungsfaktoren für Existenz und Lebensformen im Hinterland (= Beiträge zur Geschichte des Hinterlandes. Vol. V). Biedenkopf, 1996.
 Karl Scheld: Wider das Vergessen. Kempkes, Gladenbach, 2005,  (including details of the Aurora Works and iron smelting industry in the Hessian Hinterland).
 Hinterländer Geschichtsblätter, since 1907, .

External links 
 Hinterland Community Association

Geography of Hesse
Middle Hesse
Grand Duchy of Hesse